During the 1991–92 English football season, U.S. Foggia competed in Serie A.

Season summary
The team managed by Zeman arrives in Serie A in the 1991-92 championship. Foggia plays a decent season surprising everyone with a superb offensive system. The Italian media and even European media talk about the team calling Zemanlandia or Miraculous Foggia. The almighty trio of forwards: Signori-Baiano-Rambaudi gave amazing games through the year.
Foggia finished 9th in Serie A. Their attacking 4-3-3 formation saw the club score 58 goals, more than any other club but champions A.C. Milan, and challenge for a place in the UEFA Cup. However, their leaky defense - the team also conceded 58 goals, exceeded only by bottom club Ascoli - scuppered their European charge.

Squad

Competitions

Serie A

League table

Matches

Goalscorers
Francesco Baiano  16	
Giuseppe Signori  11	
Roberto Rambaudi   9	
Igor Shalimov      9	
Dan Petrescu       4	
Igor Kolyvanov     3	
Maurizio Codispoti 2	
Pasquale Padalino  1	
Mauro Picasso      1	
Alessandro Porro   1

Coppa Italia 

Round of 16

Statistics

Player Statistics

References

Foggia